Resistivity index may refer to:

Arterial resistivity index, Pourcelot index
Archie's law, electrical resistivity index